"Vice" is the fifth single released by English rock band Razorlight, taken from their debut album, Up All Night (2004). It followed "Golden Touch" into the UK top 20. The lyrics feature the word "love" spelled out in letters, the outro repeating this several times. Near the end of the song, Johnny Borrell gave out his then mobile phone number, allowing fans to call or text him.

The B-side to one format of the single is a cover of Outkast's "Hey Ya!," recorded with the London Community Gospel Choir (who also appeared on Blur's hit "Tender").

Track listings  
 UK CD1
 "Vice" – 3:13
 "Hey Ya!" (Jo Whiley Session) – 4:16

 UK CD2
 "Vice" – 3:13
 "Believe in Me" – 1:52
 "Anabelle Says – 4 Track" – 2:59

 UK 7-inch single
 "Vice" (full length radio mix) – 3:13
 "Golden Touch" – 3:20

References

2004 singles
2004 songs
Vertigo Records singles
Razorlight songs
Songs written by Johnny Borrell